Mohamed Amguoun (born 8 November 1988) is a visually impaired Moroccan sprinter and middle-distance runner. Competing in the T13 classification, Amguoun represented Morocco at the 2012 Summer Paralympics in London, where he won the bronze medal in the 400m sprint. He is also a World Championship winning athlete, taking gold in his favoured 400m race at the 2015 IPC Athletics World Championships in Doha.

References 

1988 births
Living people
Sportspeople from Casablanca
Moroccan male sprinters
Paralympic athletes of Morocco
Paralympic gold medalists for Morocco
Paralympic silver medalists for Morocco
Paralympic bronze medalists for Morocco
Athletes (track and field) at the 2012 Summer Paralympics
Athletes (track and field) at the 2016 Summer Paralympics
Athletes (track and field) at the 2020 Summer Paralympics
Medalists at the 2012 Summer Paralympics
Medalists at the 2016 Summer Paralympics
Medalists at the 2020 Summer Paralympics
World record holders in Paralympic athletics
Paralympic medalists in athletics (track and field)